Maria Bailey (born 21 November 1975) is a former Irish Fine Gael politician who served as a Teachta Dála (TD) for the Dún Laoghaire constituency from 2016 to 2020. She served as Chair of the Committee on Housing, Planning and Local Government 2016 to 2019.

Her career in Dáil Éireann ended after a personal injury controversy known as "swing-gate", which led to her de-selection by Fine Gael as a candidate in the 2020 general election.

Bailey is the daughter of former Dún Laoghaire–Rathdown County Councillor John Bailey. She was a member of Dún Laoghaire–Rathdown County Council from 2004 to 2016.

Legal claim
The controversy became known as "swing-gate".

Bailey alleges she injured herself after falling from the swing, and that no instructions in how to use the swing had been provided. The hotel fought the case and maintained that Bailey was holding items in both hands when she fell. The case arose at a time when there is "considerable political focus on personal injury awards and high insurance costs." Independent Senator Michael McDowell, speaking about the case in the Seanad, said: "It does occur to me that we live in a strange world where civil liability can exist in such circumstances but maybe we are only hearing a portion of the evidence. If the Government is serious about driving down the claims culture, we cannot stand idly by when adults lose their seat with two objects, one in each hand, and fall off a swing and then claim there should have been a supervisor looking after them." She had reportedly been holding a beer in one hand and a wine bottle in the other. Leader of the Opposition Micheál Martin said the case "flies in the face of everything being done to keep insurance costs down."

She dropped the compensation claim after it emerged that she had run a 10 km race in under an hour, only three weeks after the fall, despite claiming in court documents that she could not run in the three months after the accident. The Irish Independent also reposted social media pictures of Bailey attending the Longitude Music Festival eight days after the alleged incident.

Two days after polling day in the 2019 local elections,  Leo Varadkar said that news of the compensation claim in the week preceding the elections had caused reputational damage to Fine Gael. On 27 May, Bailey gave an interview described by some Fine Gael colleagues as "a car crash" and "the worst political interview I’ve ever heard", on the Today with Seán O'Rourke RTÉ radio programme. In the interview, she said that the media had "crossed the line of public invasion and humanity." Health minister Simon Harris said of the interview "I think it was an unfortunate interview. I think when you withdraw a claim I think it is in and of itself an acknowledgement of the fact that perhaps that claim shouldn’t have proceeded, yet the interview seems to be very much in the space of blaming lots of other people." On 29 May, Fine Gael announced it was going to undertake "an internal review to establish all facts." In July 2019, Leo Varadkar announced that as a result of the review, Bailey was being removed as chair of the Oireachtas Housing Committee.

In May 2020, it was reported that Bailey had lodged a High Court defamation proceedings against the publisher of the Irish Daily Mirror. The same month, a prominent personal injuries lawyer told the Irish Independent that, one year after it first made the headlines, the Bailey case was "probably the single most important event in the whole controversy over damages and claims and compo culture", with solicitors "think[ing] much longer and harder" about which cases to become involved with and claimants "far more reluctant to get themselves tarred by the Maria Bailey brush".

Deselection
As the controversy unfolded, Bailey faced criticism from her own party and constituency members, including calls for her to be removed as a candidate in the next general election.

In October 2019, a vote of no-confidence was put forward from her own constituency members but was deferred until a later date, while elected colleagues removed her image from their social media platforms. In November 2019, the Fine Gael National Executive voted to deselect her as a candidate in the next general election.

References

External links
Maria Bailey's page on the Fine Gael website

1976 births
Living people
Members of the 32nd Dáil
Fine Gael TDs
Local councillors in Dún Laoghaire–Rathdown
21st-century women Teachtaí Dála